Metamesia elegans is a species of moth of the family Tortricidae. It is found in the Democratic Republic of Congo, Kenya, South Africa (Gauteng, KwaZulu-Natal), Tanzania and Uganda.

References

Moths described in 1881
Archipini